Mohiyedine Sharif (Arabic: محيي الدين الشريف; killed March 29, 1998), also known as The Electrician, was a master bombmaker for Hamas. A protégé of Yahya Ayyash, Sharif was responsible for the First and second Jerusalem bus 18 massacres, and the Ashkelon bus station bombing.

Sharif gained a Bachelor Of Arts degree in electronic engineering at the Al-Quds University. Sharif died in a car explosion near a garage in Ramallah on March 29, 1998. Many Palestinians believe that he was a victim to internal struggles between Palestinian militias.

Following his death, the Palestinian Authority arrested five members of Hamas for his killing. But Hamas said that the Preventive Security Force by its commander Jibril Rajoub killed Sharif after they arrested him.

References

1966 births
1998 deaths
Hamas military members
Assassinated Palestinian people
Suicide bombing in the Israeli–Palestinian conflict
Palestinian mass murderers
Al-Quds University alumni